The Verge is an American technology news website operated by Vox Media, publishing news, feature stories, guidebooks, product reviews, consumer electronics news, and podcasts.

The website launched on November 1, 2011, and uses Vox Media's proprietary multimedia publishing platform Chorus. In 2014, Nilay Patel was named editor-in-chief and Dieter Bohn executive editor; Helen Havlak was named editorial director in 2017. The Verge won five Webby Awards for the year 2012 including awards for Best Writing (Editorial), Best Podcast for The Vergecast, Best Visual Design, Best Consumer Electronics Site, and Best Mobile News App.

History

Origins 
Between March and April 2011, up to nine of Engadgets writers, editors, and product developers, including editor-in-chief Joshua Topolsky, left AOL, the company behind that website, to start a new gadget site. The other departing editors included managing editor Nilay Patel and staffers Paul Miller, Ross Miller, Joanna Stern, Chris Ziegler, as well as product developers Justin Glow, and Dan Chilton. In early April 2011, Topolsky announced that their unnamed new site would be produced in partnership with sports news website SB Nation, debuting some time in the fall. Topolsky lauded SB Nation similar interest in the future of publishing, including what he described as their beliefs in independent journalism and in-house development of their own content delivery tools. Jim Bankoff of SB Nation saw an overlap in the two sites' demographics and an opportunity to expand SB Nation model. Bankoff previously worked at AOL in 2005, where he led their Engadget acquisition. Other news outlets viewed the partnership as positive for both SB Nation and Topolsky's staff, and negative for AOL's outlook.

Bankoff, chairman and CEO of Vox Media (owner of SB Nation), said in a 2011 interview that though the company had started out with a focus on sports, other categories including consumer technology had growth potential for the company. Development of Vox Media's content management system (CMS), Chorus, was led by Trei Brundrett, who later became the chief operating officer for the company.

This Is My Next 
Following news of his untitled partnership with SB Nation in April 2011, Topolsky announced that the Engadget podcast hosted by Patel, Paul Miller, and himself would continue at an interim site called This Is My Next. By August 2011, the site had reached 1 million unique visitors and 3.4 million page views. By October 2011, the site had 3 million unique views per month and 10 million total page views. Time listed the site in its Best Blogs of 2011, calling the prototype site "exemplary". The site closed upon The Verges launch on November 1, 2011.

On June 11, 2014, The Verge launched a new section called "This Is My Next", edited by former editor David Pierce, as a buyer's guide for consumer electronics. By 2022, this section had been retitled simply "Buying Guide".

Launch 
The Verge launched November 1, 2011, along with an announcement of a new parent company: Vox Media. According to the company, the site launched with 4 million unique visitors and 20 million pageviews. At the time of Topolsky's departure, Engadget had 14 million unique visitors. Vox Media overall doubled its unique visitors to about 15 million during the last half of 2012. The Verge had 12 former Engadget staffers working with Topolsky at the time of launch. In 2013, The Verge launched a new science section, Verge Science, with former Wired editor Katie Drummond leading the effort. Patel replaced Topolsky as editor-in-chief in mid-2014. Journalist Walt Mossberg joined The Verge editing team after Vox Media acquired Recode in 2015. By 2016, the website's advertising had shifted from display advertisements, matched with articles' contents, to partnerships and advertisements adjusted to the user.

2016–present 

Vox Media revamped The Verge visual design for its fifth anniversary in November 2016. Its logo featured a modified Penrose triangle, an impossible object. On November 1, The Verge launched version 3.0 of its news platform, offering a redesigned website along with the new logo.

In September 2016, The Verge fired deputy editor Chris Ziegler after it learned that he had been working for Apple since July. Helen Havlak was promoted to editorial director in mid-2017. In 2017, The Verge launched "Guidebook" to host technology product reviews. In May 2018, Verge Science launched a YouTube channel, which had more than 638,000 subscribers and 30 million views by January 2019. The channel received more than 5.3 million views in November 2018 alone.

In March 2022, Dieter Bohn announced his resignation from The Verge in his position of Executive Editor, and that he would be moving to a new position at Google. 

The Verge redesigned its user experience in September 2022 with an edgier logo and more colorful visual design. Its new home page format resembled a Twitter feed, incorporating external conversations from social media and reporting from other publications. The new format will, in part, reduce aggregation reporting.

Content

Podcasts 
The Verge broadcasts a live weekly podcast, The Vergecast. The inaugural episode was November 4, 2011. It included a video stream of the hosts. A second weekly podcast was introduced on November 8, 2011. Unlike The Vergecast, The Verge Mobile Show was primarily focused on mobile phones. The Verge also launched the weekly podcast Ctrl-Walt-Delete, hosted by Walt Mossberg, in September 2015. The Verge What's Tech podcast was named among iTunes's best of 2015. The podcast Why'd You Push That Button?, launched in 2017 and co-hosted by Ashley Carman and Kaitlyn Tiffany, received a Podcast Award in the "This Week in Tech Technology Category" in 2018.

Editor-in-chief Nilay Patel hosts an interview podcast called Decoder.

Video content

On The Verge 
On August 6, 2011, in an interview with the firm Edelman, The Verge co-founder Marty Moe announced it was launching The Verge Show, a web television series. After its launch, the show was named On The Verge. The first episode was recorded on Monday, November 14, 2011, with guest Matias Duarte. The show is a technology news entertainment show, and its format is similar to that of a late-night talk show, but it is broadcast over the Internet, not on television. The show's first episode was released on November 15, 2011.

Ten episodes of On The Verge were broadcast, with the most recent episode going out on November 10, 2012. On May 24, 2013, it was announced that the show would return under a new weekly format, alongside a new logo and theme tune.

Other video content 
On May 8, 2013, editor-in-chief Topolsky announced Verge Video, a website that contains the video backlog from The Verge.

Circuit Breaker, a gadget blog, launched in 2016, has amassed nearly one million Facebook followers and debuted a live show on Twitter in October 2017. The blog's videos average more than 465,000 views, and Jake Kastrenakes serves as editor-in-chief, as of 2017. Also in 2016, USA Network and The Verge partnered on Mr. Robot Digital After Show, a digital aftershow for the television series Mr. Robot. In December, Twitter and Vox Media announced a live streaming partnership for The Verge programs covering the Consumer Electronics Show.

The series Next Level, hosted and produced by Lauren Goode, debuted in 2017 and was recognized in the "Technology" category at the 47th annual San Francisco / Northern California Emmy Awards (2018). In August 2017, The Verge launched the web series Space Craft, hosted by science reporter Loren Grush.

Controversy

2018 PC build guide
In September 2018, The Verge published the article "How to Build a Custom PC for Editing, Gaming or Coding" and uploaded a video to YouTube entitled "How we Built a $2000 Custom Gaming PC", which was criticized for containing errors on almost every step presented by the video's reporter, Stefan Etienne, such as the PSU being installed in the wrong direction preventing its cooling fan from functioning properly, improperly installing the AIO cooler, forgetting a screw on the CPU heatsink, and naming LEDs as a main reason to buy RAM. After initially disabling comments, The Verge removed the video though reuploads exist.

In February 2019, lawyers from The Verge parent company Vox Media filed a DMCA takedown notice, requesting that YouTube remove videos critical of The Verges video, alleging copyright infringement. YouTube took down two of the videos, uploaded by YouTube channels BitWit and ReviewTechUSA, while applying a copyright "strike" to these two channels. YouTube later reinstated the two videos and retracted the copyright "strikes" after a request from Verge editor Nilay Patel, although Patel acknowledged that he agreed with the legal argument that led to their removal.

Timothy B. Lee of Ars Technica described this controversy as an example of the Streisand effect, saying that while law regarding fair use is unclear regarding this type of situation, "the one legal precedent ... suggests ... that this kind of video is solidly within the bounds of copyright's fair use doctrine."

Shortly after the PC build guide was released, people began to troll and harass Etienne on his social media accounts by creating jokes related to the build. The trolling and harassment continued up until September 2021, when YouTube channel Linus Tech Tips released a collaboration video with Etienne, where he builds a PC with the correct steps and tools. The video received positive reception and ended the PC build controversy.

See also

References

External links 
 

 
American technology news websites
Computing websites
Internet broadcasting
Internet properties established in 2011
Streaming television
Mass media in New York City
Podcasting companies
Video blogs
Vox Media